The 1958 Middle Tennessee Blue Raiders football team represented the Middle Tennessee State College—now known as Middle Tennessee State University—as a member of the Ohio Valley Conference (OVC) during the 1958 NCAA College Division football season. The team's captains were Harold Greer and Roy Hall.

Schedule

References

Middle Tennessee
Middle Tennessee Blue Raiders football seasons
Ohio Valley Conference football champion seasons
Middle Tennessee Blue Raiders football